"With You" is a song by American recording artist Jessica Simpson from her third studio album, In This Skin. "With You" was released by Columbia Records as the second single from In This Skin on November 3, 2003. Overall, "With You" was Simpson's seventh single in the United States  and her fourth single in the United Kingdom. Billy Mann and Andy Marvel produced the song and co-wrote it with Simpson. Musically, it is a mid-tempo pop track.

The music video for "With You" was directed by Elliott Lester while Simpson was in the reality show Newlyweds: Nick and Jessica. The video received two nominations at the MTV Video Music Award 2004 and enjoyed great commercial success.
The song peaked in the top ten in Australia and the United Kingdom, and at top-twenty in Ireland, Norway and the United States. The single was certified Platinum by the RIAA and Platinum in Australia.

Song information
"With You" was written by Jessica Simpson, Billy Mann, and Andy Marvel, and produced by Andy Marvel and Mann. "With You" lasts for three minutes and twelve seconds, and is in the key of D Minor. Musically, it is a mid-tempo pop song. According to the sheet music published at Musicnotes.com by EMI Music Publishing, the song contains instruments such as piano and guitar. About the idea of the song, Simpson said "it's cool for me just because it's my personality [...] Nick loves me with nothing but a T-shirt on so that's where the song idea came from."

Chuck Taylor of Billboard reviewed "With You" favorably, saying "It´s certainly a hitworthy candidate" and citing "Producers Billy Mann and Andy Marvel add a hint of funk to the mix, giving the track enough hip appeal to make the grade at today's top 40." The song was also a Track Pick from the AllMusic review of In This Skin by Stephen Thomas Erlewine, along with "Be", "I Had to Love You" and "Sweetest Sin".

Chart performance

North America
"With You" was released largely in hopes that the song would revive In This Skin on the charts. In the United States, the song debuted at number sixty-five on the Billboard Hot 100, on the issue dated December 27, 2003. On March 20, 2004, the single reached its peak position of number fourteen and was awarded the honor of that week's Greatest Gainer Sales. The single stayed on the chart for twenty-three weeks. "With You" became Simpson's fourth top-forty single in the US and her second highest peak on the chart since "I Wanna Love You Forever" (1999). The song also peaked at number one on Billboard Pop Songs chart and was her first number one on the chart. On the Hot Digital Tracks chart, the single debuted at number twenty-three on the issue dated January 10, 2004. The song peaked at number seven on the chart with 10,000 digital download sales by February 14, 2004. Due to strong digital download sales, the single was certified Gold by RIAA for selling 500,000 copies. It was her first certification for digital sales. As the date, "With You" is her second best selling digital single with 1 million copies sold.

Oceania and Europe
In Australia, the single debuted at number twenty-five on the ARIA Charts for the week of April 4, 2004. The next week reached at number seventeen. Seven weeks later, the song peaked at number four and stayed on the chart for twenty-four weeks. The single became her highest peak at the time and her first top-five in that country. Later was certified Platinum by ARIA, denoting shipments of 70,000 units within the country. In New Zealand, the song only reached at number thirty-nine on the issue of April 19, 2004.

In United Kingdom, the song debuted at number seven on the issue dated June 20, 2004. The single stayed on the chart for eight weeks and became her fourth top-twenty there. In Norway, the single debuted at number eleven. It descended at number thirteen the next week and stayed on the chart for six weeks. It became her third top-twenty in that country since "Irresistible" (2001). In Ireland, the song debuted at number eleven on the issue dated June 17, 2004. The single became her highest peak at the time there. Due to its appearance on several European charts, the song peaked at number twenty-five on the European Hot 100 Singles chart.

Music video

Development and release
As the single was released while Simpson's reality show, Newlyweds, was still on air and at the peak of its popularity, the video of the song was created to parallel the show. The music video for "With You" was filmed in October 2003, by Elliott Lester. This is the last music video in which Simpson and then-husband Nick Lachey appear together as husband and wife.

Synopsis
She is featured chowing down on Chicken of the Sea tuna—an allusion to the first episode, where she asks if the famous tuna brand is really chicken—and buffalo wings, a reference to another gaffe of hers, when she asks if buffalo wings come from buffalo. At one point she is sporting a T-shirt reading "plata-ma-pus," the way Jessica thought "platypus" was pronounced. She is shown around the house making haphazard attempts at housekeeping, another reference to the first episode, when Lachey reproves her for not trying to do more around the house herself. In the video, she floods a sink with soapsuds and awkwardly tries to Swiffer the kitchen floor; a later scene shows her trying to sort dirty laundry. She is also seen golfing, another thing she has difficulty with on the show.

Reception and impact
The video was a great success in programs of music channels such as MTV's Total Request Live and MuchMusic. On January 20, 2004, it debuted on Total Request Live, where it was ranked No. 1 for sixteen days and was sent to retirement after serving fifty days on the countdown; the music video also ranked No. 1 on MuchMusic. It was nominated for two VMAs at the 2004 awards in the categories of Best Female Video and Best Pop Video, but lost both of them. She performed the song at the ceremony along with "Angels". The video was the fourth Most Played Clip on MTV for the week February 1, 2004. On VH1, the music video was the sixth Most Played Video by February 22, 2004.

Track listings
DVD single
 "With You"
 "Sweetest Sin"

CD 1
 "With You" (album version) – 3:12
 "Fly" (album version) – 3:32

CD 2
 "With You" (album version)
 "With You" (acoustic version)
 "Where You Are" (edit version)
 "With You" (video)

Australian maxi single
 "With You"
 "Irresistible"
 "I Wanna Love You Forever"

Credits and personnel
 Songwriting: Billy Mann, Andy Marvel, Jessica Simpson
 Production: Billy Mann, Andy Marvel

Charts

Weekly charts

Year-end charts

Certifications

Release history

References

2003 singles
Jessica Simpson songs
Songs written by Billy Mann
Songs written by Jessica Simpson
Songs written by Andy Marvel
2003 songs
Music videos directed by Elliott Lester